Eugénie is the French version of the female given name Eugenia.

Eugénie or Eugenie may also refer to:
 Eugénie (1793 ship), a French privateer
 Eugenie (play), by Pierre Augustin Caron de Beaumarchais
 Eugénie Archipelago, in the Peter the Great Gulf of the Sea of Japan
 Eugenie Glacier, on Ellesmere Island, Nunavut, Canada

See also
 Eugénie-les-Bains, a commune in Aquitaine in south-western France